Jay Mazur (born January 22, 1965) is a Canadian-born American former professional ice hockey forward. He played 47 games in the National Hockey League with the Vancouver Canucks between 1988 and 1992, spending the rest of his career in the minor leagues before retiring in 2001.

Personal life
Mazur was born in Hamilton, Ontario and raised in Akron, Ohio. Mazur's father was a petroleum engineer who spent time in both the US and Canada. Mazur was selected by the Vancouver Canucks in the 12th round of the 1983 NHL Entry Draft from Breck HS in Minnesota. Mazur then spent four years at the University of Maine, where he earned a degree in physical education.

Playing career
Mazur turned pro in 1987 and signed with the Canucks. His first three pro seasons were spent primarily with the Canucks' IHL farm teams where he was a productive scorer, although he did manage to earn two callups and gain six games of NHL experience. While his size (6'1" 210 lbs) and scoring touch were attractive to a small Canuck team, he needed time in the IHL to work on his skating, which was marginal by NHL standards.

Mazur had a strong training camp in 1990 to crack Vancouver's NHL squad full-time. Unfortunately, though, his season was curtailed by two major injuries which limited him to only 36 games. However, he was productive in his limited action, finishing with 11 goals and 18 points. He also played in all 6 playoff games in Vancouver's opening-round loss to the Los Angeles Kings.

Mazur was again on the Canucks' roster to start the 1991–92 season, although he was seeing limited action as a depth player. Following the team's signing of Russian superstar forward Pavel Bure a month into the season on October 31, Mazur was the odd man out and was reassigned to the AHL.

He spent three more years in Vancouver's farm system before finally parting ways with the Canucks in 1994. He then became something of a hockey nomad, playing for 8 different pro teams in 5 different minor-pro leagues, as well as brief stops in Italy and Germany, before retiring in 2001.

Post-playing career
Following his retirement he returned to Maine, where he currently coaches high-school hockey at Scarborough High School and was a Gym Teacher at Scarborough Middle School.

Career statistics

Regular season and playoffs

References

External links

Profile at hockeydraftcentral.com

1965 births
Living people
Alexandria Warthogs players
American men's ice hockey right wingers
American people of Canadian descent
Canadian ice hockey right wingers
Detroit Vipers players
Flint Spirits players
Fredericton Express players
Hamilton Canucks players
Ice hockey people from Ontario
Sportspeople from Hamilton, Ontario
Ice hockey players from Ohio
Maine Black Bears men's ice hockey players
Milwaukee Admirals (IHL) players
Mohawk Valley Prowlers players
New Haven Knights players
Pee Dee Pride players
Portland Pirates players
Rochester Americans players
Sportspeople from Akron, Ohio
Tallahassee Tiger Sharks players
Vancouver Canucks draft picks
Vancouver Canucks players
Motor City Mustangs players